Van Wyck is an unincorporated community in Whatcom County, in the U.S. state of Washington.

History
A post office called Van Wyck was established in 1891, and remained in operation until 1904. The community has the name of Alexander Van Wyck.

References

Unincorporated communities in Whatcom County, Washington
Unincorporated communities in Washington (state)